Mamadou Sakho (born 25 January 1951) is a Senegalese wrestler. He competed at the 1976 Summer Olympics, the 1980 Summer Olympics and the 1984 Summer Olympics.

References

External links
 

1951 births
Living people
Senegalese male sport wrestlers
Olympic wrestlers of Senegal
Wrestlers at the 1976 Summer Olympics
Wrestlers at the 1980 Summer Olympics
Wrestlers at the 1984 Summer Olympics
People from Ziguinchor
20th-century Senegalese people
21st-century Senegalese people